Wei Huixiao (born November 1977) is a Chinese naval officer who is the current captain of Type 052D destroyer Shaoxing, in office since March 2022. She is a representative of the 19th National Congress of the Chinese Communist Party.

Biography
Wei was born into a Zhuang ethnicity family in Baise, Guangxi, in November 1977.

In 1996, she entered Nanjing University. In October 1998, the university awarded the "Honorary Doctor" degree to former U.S. President George H. W. Bush. The university determined Wei to be the messenger of flowers. When she congratulated Bush in fluent English, Bush held her hand and said, "you are a beautiful girl."

After graduating in 2000, she joined Huawei as a senior vice president secretary and administrative assistant, and won the company's "Gold Medal Individual" award and the title of "Gold Medal Team" for her excellent performance. In 2004, she became a graduate student at the Department of Earth Sciences, Sun Yat-sen University. During her studies, she became a volunteer in Nyingchi, Wenchuan County and later the 2008 Beijing Olympic Games.

Wei enlisted in the People's Liberation Army (PLA) in January 2012 and became a crew member at the Chinese aircraft carrier Liaoning. After studying navigation command and ship tactical command from Dalian Naval Academy in March 2014, she was promoted to deputy chief of Navigation Department of the Chinese aircraft carrier Liaoning. In January 2015, she visited the United States as a member of the delegation of the first batch of navy ship captains. In April 2015, she was promoted to practice vice captain of the Changchun destroyer and was promoted again to vice captain in March 2016. In 2017, she was reassigned as vice captain of the Zhengzhou destroyer, and was elevated to practice captain in February 2018. In April 2022, she rose to become captain of Type 052D destroyer Shaoxing, becoming the first female captain of the People's Liberation Army Navy.

References

1977 births
Living people
Zhuang people
People from Baise
Nanjing University alumni
Sun Yat-sen University alumni
Dalian Naval Academy alumni
People's Liberation Army Navy personnel
Chinese colonels
Female sailors
Chinese female military personnel
Sea captains
Huawei people
Chinese beauty pageant winners